Hposandin is a village in Myinmu Township in the southeast of the Sagaing Division in Burma.  It is located northwest of Allagappa.

External links
Maplandia World Gazetteer

Populated places in Sagaing District